Sarah Gibson may refer to:

 Sarah Gibson (filmmaker), Australian filmmaker, involved with the 1975 International Women's Film Festival
 Sarah Gibson (swimmer) (born 1995), American swimmer
 Sarah E. Gibson, American solar physicist
 Sarah Gibson Blanding (1898–1985), American educator and academic administrator
 Sarah Gibson Humphreys (1830–1907), American author and suffragist